Francisco Antonio de la Dueña y Cisneros (referred to in Catalan as Francesc Antoni de la Dueña y Cisneros) (1753–1821), was a Spanish clergyman.  He was born in Villanueva de la Fuente, Ciudad Real, and was Bishop of Urgell (and ex officio Co-Prince of Andorra) from 29 October 1797 to 23 September 1816.

References

1753 births
1821 deaths
18th-century Princes of Andorra
19th-century Princes of Andorra
People from the Province of Ciudad Real
Bishops of Urgell
18th-century Roman Catholic bishops in Spain
19th-century Roman Catholic bishops in Spain